Kassem Mohammed El Zein (born 2 December 1990) is a Lebanese footballer who plays as a defender for  club Nejmeh and the Lebanon national team.

El Zein began his senior career in 2011 at Nejmeh, playing over 100 league matches. In 2020 he was sent on a loan, to Iraqi club Al-Mina'a and Kuwaiti club Al-Nasr, respectively. El Zein made his international debut for Lebanon in 2014, and was part of the 2019 AFC Asian Cup squad.

Club career

Al-Mina'a 
On 28 January 2020, El Zein was sent on a three-month loan to Iraqi Premier League side Al-Mina'a. He made his debut on 17 February 2020, in a 1–0 home win over Naft Al-Janoob in the first matchday of the season. El Zein played four league games for Al-Mina'a; however, the season was cancelled due to the COVID-19 pandemic.

Al-Nasr 
On 18 June 2020, El Zein was sent on a one-year loan to Kuwaiti club Al-Nasr. He made his debut on 16 October, in a 2–1 win against Al-Shabab in the classification league between Kuwait Premier League and Kuwaiti Division One clubs. El Zein helped his side finish first in the qualifying stage.

His debut in the 2020–21 Kuwaiti Premier League came on 22 January 2021, in a 1–0 away win against Al-Shabab. El Zein scored a goal on 25 April, helping his side to a 2–1 away win against Al-Fahaheel. He finished the season with 17 league games.

Nejmeh 
El Zein returned to Nejmeh for the 2021–22 season. His contract was renewed in 2022.

International career 

El Zein debuted for the Lebanon national team on 14 October 2014, in a friendly against Saudi Arabia. In December 2018, he was called up for the 2019 AFC Asian Cup, where he played a group stage game against Saudi Arabia.

Style of play 
Initially starting out as a full-back, El Zein progressed into a centre-back with the years; his main abilities are his tackling and reading of the game.

Personal life 
El Zein works as a part-time chef at L'Avenue Du Parc, a restaurant in Beirut. He stated that "while in other countries football can be a full-time job, in Lebanon it’s necessary for a player to have a second job."

El Zein's favourite club is Manchester United, while his favourite player is former Manchester United defender Nemanja Vidić.

Career statistics

International

Honours 
Nejmeh
 Lebanese Premier League: 2013–14
 Lebanese FA Cup: 2015–16, 2021–22
 Lebanese Elite Cup: 2014, 2016, 2017, 2018, 2021
 Lebanese Super Cup: 2014, 2016; runner-up: 2021

Individual
 Lebanese Premier League Team of the Season: 2018–19

References

External links

 
 
 
 
 

1990 births
Living people
Lebanese footballers
Lebanese chefs
People from Tyre District
Association football defenders
Association football central defenders
Association football fullbacks
Lebanese Premier League players
Nejmeh SC players
Lebanese expatriate footballers
Expatriate footballers in Iraq
Lebanese expatriate sportspeople in Iraq
Iraqi Premier League players
Al-Mina'a SC players
Expatriate footballers in Kuwait
Lebanese expatriate sportspeople in Kuwait
Kuwait Premier League players
Al-Nasr SC (Kuwait) players
Lebanon international footballers
2019 AFC Asian Cup players